Believe is the fifth studio album and the debut English language album by Russian singer and songwriter Dima Bilan. It was released in 2009. The album includes his Eurovision Song Contest 2008 winning song "Believe".

Track listing
 "Automatic Lady"
 "Don't Leave"
 "Amnesia" Written by Ryan Tedder and Jesse McCartney)
 "Number 1 Fan"
 "Believe"
 "Lonely" 
 "Mistakes" 
 "Lady" 
 "Anythin 4 Love" (feat. D.O.E.) 
 "Porque Aun Te Amo" (Produced by Rudy Perez) 
 "In Circles" (Ciara Cleary)
 "Take Me With You" 
 "Lady Flame" 
 "Between The Sky And Heaven" 
 "Это Была Любовь" (Remix) 
 "Lady" (Voguesound Remix) 
 "Lady" (Opera Club Remix)

DVD Bonus video for limited-edition album

 NUMBER 1 FAN
 BELIEVE
 LONELY
 LADY

2009 albums
Dima Bilan albums

it:Believe#Musica